Pat Upton may refer to:
 Pat Upton (politician) (1944–1999), Irish Labour Party politician 
 Pat Upton (singer) (1940–2016), American singer